The 1880 Kansas gubernatorial election was held on November 2, 1880. Incumbent Republican John St. John defeated Democratic nominee Edmund G. Ross with 57.90% of the vote.

General election

Candidates
Major party candidates 
John St. John, Republican
Edmund G. Ross, Democratic

Other candidates
H. P. Vrooman, Greenback
J. P. Culver, Prohibition
F. M. Stringfield, Independent

Results

References

1880
Kansas
Gubernatorial